Dieter Eilts (born 13 December 1964) is a German former professional footballer who played as a midfielder. After retiring as a player, he began a managerial career and also worked for SV Werder Bremen as director of the football academy.

Playing career
Born in Upgant-Schott, East Frisia, Eilts had the reputation of being the quintessential midfield blue-collar worker. He played 390 matches in the Bundesliga for SV Werder Bremen, his only club during his whole professional career, and scored seven goals. He was also lauded as one of the most responsible and sensible players of the league, never appearing in the yellow press and always leading by example. Eilts is regarded as one of the finest discoveries of legendary coach Otto Rehhagel.

Eilts also was a regular with the German squad, collecting 31 caps. His finest games came in the 1996 European Championship, when he, Matthias Sammer and Thomas Helmer formed the defensive backbone of the team that won the trophy.

Eilts went to EURO '96 with the reputation of an outstanding club servant with Werder Bremen under future competition hero Otto Rehhagel, but at international level he was relatively inexperienced and had never previously participated in a major tournament. There were doubts in the German media over the wisdom of handing him the midfield anchorman role in England, but the wiry East Frisian surprised everybody with the class and composure of his play. It was his tactical appreciation and willingness to drop back into defence that enabled sweeper Matthias Sammer to make many dangerous sorties into enemy territory as his team let in just three goals, one of which came in the final after Eilts had been forced off due to injury. He closed his international career in 1997 with 31 caps, six of those coming in England, but captained Bremen until 2002, clocking up 390 Bundesliga appearances over a 17-year period. He won two German championships, three German Cups and, in 1992, the UEFA European Cup Winners' Cup. Since retirement he has coached the Germany Under-19 and U21 squads.

After retiring
After his player career, Eilts trained the German U19 squad, and from 6 August 2004, he was the coach of the German U21 squad. Latterly, he coached German second league team Hansa Rostock, but was released from his contract on 6 March 2009 after poor league results.

In 2009, Eilts was appointed as youth manager for VfL Oldenburg. In January 2011, he got a new role as youth-coordinator in the club.

Eilts got on 27 January 2012 the job as Director of football academy at SV Werder Bremen.

Nickname
Eilts' nickname was Ostfriesen-Alemão (the Alemão of East Frisia). It was coined by his then-manager Otto Rehhagel in a press conference ahead of a Werder Bremen match against S.S.C. Napoli in the UEFA Cup in reference to Napoli's Brazilian star midfielder Alemão.

Career statistics

Club

International

Honours
Werder Bremen
 Bundesliga: 1987–88, 1992–93
 DFB-Pokal: 1990–91, 1993–94, 1998–99
 European Cup Winners' Cup: 1991–92
 UEFA Intertoto Cup: 1998
 DFL-Supercup: 1993, 1994

Germany
 UEFA European Championship: 1996

Individual
 UEFA European Championship Team of the Tournament: 1996

References

 Werder Bremen profile

1964 births
Living people
People from Aurich (district)
Footballers from Lower Saxony
Association football midfielders
SV Werder Bremen players
SV Werder Bremen II players
German footballers
Germany international footballers
German football managers
UEFA Euro 1996 players
UEFA European Championship-winning players
FC Hansa Rostock managers
Bundesliga players
2. Bundesliga managers
Germany national under-21 football team managers
West German footballers